The Truscott Baronetcy, of Oakleigh in East Grinstead in the County of Sussex, is a title in the Baronetage of the United Kingdom. It was created on 16 July 1909 for Sir George Truscott. He was Chairman of Brown, Knight & Truscott, Ltd, printers and stationers, and served as Lord Mayor of London from 1908 to 1909. Truscott was the son of Sir Francis Wyatt Truscott, Lord Mayor of London from 1879 to 1880. As of 28 February 2014 the present Baronet has not successfully proven his succession and is therefore not on the Official Roll of the Baronetage, with the baronetcy considered dormant since 2001.

Truscott Baronets, of Oakleigh (1909)
Sir George Wyatt Truscott, 1st Baronet (1857–1941)
Sir Eric Homewood Stanham Truscott, 2nd Baronet (1898–1973)
Sir George James Irving Truscott, 3rd Baronet (1929–2001)
Sir Ralph Eric Nicholson Truscott, 4th Baronet (born 1966)

References

Kidd, Charles, Williamson, David (editors). Debrett's Peerage and Baronetage (1990 edition). New York: St Martin's Press, 1990.

Truscott